Acroscyphus is a genus of lichenized fungi in the family Caliciaceae. This is a monotypic genus, containing the single fruticose species Acroscyphus sphaerophoroides. It is found in various locations in the cordilleras of western North America, including Mexico and British Columbia, as well as high exposed regions of Asia (China, Japan), South Africa, Peru, and Patagonia.

References

Caliciales
Lichen genera
Monotypic Lecanoromycetes genera
Taxa described in 1846
Taxa named by Joseph-Henri Léveillé